Among the Dead Sea Scrolls, 7Q5 is the designation for a small Greek papyrus fragment discovered in Qumran Cave 7 and dated before anyone claimed to be able to identify it by its style of script as likely having been written sometime between 50 BCE and 50 CE. The significance of this fragment is derived from an argument made by Spanish papyrologist Jose O'Callaghan in his work ¿Papiros neotestamentarios en la cueva 7 de Qumrân? ("New Testament Papyri in Cave 7 at Qumran?") in 1972, later reasserted and expanded by German scholar Carsten Peter Thiede in his work The Earliest Gospel Manuscript? in 1982. The assertion is that the previously unidentified 7Q5 is actually a fragment of the Gospel of Mark, chapter 6, verses 52 and 53. Some scholars have not been convinced by O'Callaghan's and Thiede's identification, insisting it is "now virtually universally rejected".

O'Callaghan's proposed identification 
This shows the Greek text of Mark 6:52-53. Bold characters represent proposed identifications with characters from 7Q5:

ου γαρ
συνηκαν επι τοις αρτοις,
αλλ ην αυτων η καρδια πεπωρω-
μενη. και διαπερασαντες [επι την γην]
ηλθον εις γεννησαρετ και 
προσωρμισθησαν. και εξελ-
θοντων αυτων εκ του πλοιου ευθυς
επιγνοντες αυτον.

for they did not
understand concerning the loaves
but was their heart harden-
ed. And crossing over [unto the land]
they came unto Gennesaret and
drew to the shore. And com-
ing forth out of the boat immediately
they recognized him.

Argument 

The argument is as follows:
 First, the combination of letters ννησ <nnēs> in line 4 may be part of the word Γεννησαρετ <Gennēsaret>.
 Secondly, the spacing before the word και <kai> ("and") suggests a paragraph break, which is consistent with the normative layout for Mark 6:52-53.
 Furthermore, a computer search "using the most elaborate Greek texts ... has failed to yield any text other than Mark 6:52-53 for the combination of letters identified by O'Callaghan et al. in 7Q5".

A few counterarguments exist.
 The spacing before the word και <kai> ("and") proposed as a paragraph break may not be indicative of anything.
 In papyri spacings of this width can be also found within words (Pap. Bodmer XXIV, plate 26; in Qumran in fragment 4Q122).
 Other examples in the Qumran texts show that the word και <kai> ("and") usually was separated with spacings – and this has nothing to do with the text's structure (as proposed by O'Callaghan).
 The sequence ννησ can be also found in the word εγεννησεν <egennēsen> ("begot"), which was the original suggestion as to its identity.
 This suggestion was proposed by the authors of the fragment's first edition (editio princeps) published in 1962.
 If so, the fragment likely would be part of a genealogy account.

Further counterarguments
 To make the identification of the fragment with Mark 6:52-53, O'Callaghan had to substitute a δ (delta)  for the τ (tau)  found in line 3 of 7Q5, a substitution most scholars do not accept, although it is not without precedent in the ancient world.
 To make 7Q5 'fit' Mark 6:52-53, the words επι την γην <epi tēn gēn> ("to the land") in line 4, which are found in Mark 6:53, would have to be considered as being omitted from 7Q5 in order to fit into its column. However, this omission is found in no extant manuscripts of Mark's Gospel.
 The identification of the last letter in line 2 with nu does not fit into the pattern of this Greek letter as it is clearly written in line 4.
 The computer search performed by Thiede assumed that all the disputed letter identifications made by O'Callaghan were correct, an assumption which is rejected by scholars.
 A similar search performed by scholar Daniel Wallace, which allowed other identifications for the disputed letters, found sixteen matches.
 A computer search performed with the undisputed letters of the fragment 7Q5 does not find the text Mk 6:52-53, because the undisputed letter τ in line 3 does not fit to this text.

Anachronism found in Mark's Gospel
 Another problem with identifying 7Q5 as Mark's gospel is the argument that Mark 12:13–17 contains a reference to Vespasian's Fiscus Judaicus imposed in 71 AD, meaning the gospel had to be written after this date, while 7Q5 dates to before 50 AD.

Significance 

Since the amount of text in the manuscript is so small, even a confirmation of 7Q5 as Markan "might mean nothing more than that the contents of these few verses were already formalized, not necessarily that there was a manuscript of Mark's Gospel on hand". Since the entirety of the find in Cave 7 consists of fragments in Greek, it is possible that the contents of this cave are of a separate "Hellenized" library than the Hebrew texts found in the other caves. Additionally, as Robert Eisenman points out:
Most scholars agree that the scrolls were deposited in the cave in or around 68 AD, but often mistake this date ... for the terminus ad quem for the deposit of the scrolls in the caves/cessation of Jewish habitation at the site, when it cannot be considered anything but the terminus a quo for both of these, i.e., not the latest but the earliest possible date for such a deposit and/or Jewish abandonment of the site. The actual terminus ad quem for both of these events, however difficult it may be to accept at first, is 136 AD. (Italics in original.)

So, for this is long after the currently accepted date range for the composition of Mark, according to Eisenman this would mean that even if it could be proved that 7Q5 is a Mark fragment, an earlier composition date for the gospel could not be proved. Although the fragment has been analysed and dated paleographically, as Brent Nongbri said, the dating of a such small fragment on account of paleography is not appropriate.

Consequences 
If one finds the missing link that conclusively determines the identity of 7Q5 (for example another fragment of the same corpus or another Greek text that ratifies the Ocallaghian identification or refutes it), different consequences can be foreseen. In the case where it is concluded in an absolute manner that it is a fragment of the Gospel of Mark, hypothetically dated from a date between 60s and 70s, it would coincide in having been written on a date before 73, the year in which the community of Qumran was destroyed by the Romans. As the 7Q5 was dated between 50 BCE and 50 CE, it is feasible that - being of Mark - implies that there were written fragments of the Gospel chronologically close to the historicity of Jesus. A blunt identification of 7Q5 as a fragment of the Gospel of Mark — commonly believed to be the first-written of the three Synoptic Gospels and have been used as a source by the other two (Matthew and Luke) — would represent an intellectual setback for scholars who conclude that the canonical Gospel of Mark was drafted closely after 70.

See also
 4Q108
 4QMMT
 List of New Testament papyri
 List of New Testament uncials

Notes

References
 
 
 Vito Sibilio, La datazione dei Vangeli. Una messa a punto della situazione, in Christianitas. Rivista di storia cultura e pensiero del Cristianesimo I/1 2013 Gennaio pp. 15–29 http://www.christianitas.it/n.1-incipit-indice.pdf
 Zeichmann, Christopher (2017). "The Date of Mark’s Gospel Apart from the Temple and Rumors of War: The Taxation Episode (12:13–17) as Evidence". https://www.academia.edu/34194619/The_Date_of_Mark_s_Gospel_Apart_from_the_Temple_and_Rumors_of_War_The_Taxation_Episode_12_13_17_as_Evidence

Further reading
 Enste, Stefan: Kein Markustext in Qumran. Eine Untersuchung der These: Qumran-Fragment 7Q5 = Mk 6,52-53, Freiburg/Göttingen 2000 (NTOA 45).
 Estrada, David and White, Jr., William: The First New Testament, Nashville/Thomas Nelson Inc. 1978, .

External links

 7Q5: The Earliest NT Papyrus?

 Greek Qumran Fragment 7Q5: Possibilities and Impossibilities
 7Q5 – An Interesting Detail
 Jerusalem's Essenes Gate
 7q5: Cambiar la pregunta (In Spanish)

1st-century biblical manuscripts
Dead Sea Scrolls
Papyrus